Anthony Eze Enwereuzor is a Nigerian politician and member of the 4th National Assembly representing Aba North/Aba South constituency of Abia State under the flagship of the All Nigeria Peoples Party.

See also
 Nigerian National Assembly delegation from Abia

References

People from Abia State
Living people
Igbo politicians
All Nigeria Peoples Party politicians
Year of birth missing (living people)